Quentin Carl Greenough (January 13, 1919 – August 1, 2005) was an American football player.

Football career
Greenough was born in Porterville, California and later moved to San Gabriel, California. He attended Alhambra High School, then enrolled at Oregon State College (later Oregon State University) where he became the starting center. In the 1941 season, he was credited with leading Oregon State's 10–0 defensive effort against Stanford, which behind its new T-formation had not lost a game since 1939. Greenough was chosen as an All-American, helping the Beavers to a Pacific Coast Conference championship and berth in the 1942 Rose Bowl. With Greenough anchoring the offensive line, the underdog Beavers won their first (and so far, only) Rose Bowl, upsetting Duke 20–16.

He later played in the 1944 East-West Shrine Game, and after his college career, served in the United States Coast Guard and played on the Coast Guard's football team.

After football
When his playing career ended, Greenough became an assistant football coach under Beavers head coach Lon Stiner. He married Rae Ardis DeMoss, becoming the brother-in-law of his Rose Bowl teammate Don Durdan, who was married to another DeMoss sister. (Another sister was Oregon golf champion Grace DeMoss.) Greenough later set up his own general contractor business in Corvallis, Oregon.

Greenough was named to the Oregon Sports Hall of Fame in 1981< and the Oregon State University Hall of Fame in 1991. He died in Corvallis in 2005.

References

1919 births
2005 deaths
American football centers
Alameda Coast Guard Sea Lions football players
Oregon State Beavers football coaches
Oregon State Beavers football players
Sportspeople from Alhambra, California
Sportspeople from Tulare County, California
People from San Gabriel, California
People from Porterville, California
Coaches of American football from California
Players of American football from California
United States Coast Guard personnel of World War II